Olivier Baudry (12 June 1973 – 1 October 2017) was a French footballer.

Football career
Baudry started his professional career at Sochaux. He climbed up from the youth team to the first team as captain. He followed the team relegations and promotion, until 2000 when he joined Lausanne in the Swiss Challenge League. He returned to France one year later, to join Saint-Étienne of Ligue 2. He then played two years' amateur football with Belfort of CFA2 and Giro Lepuix in Division d'Honneur (regional league).

In 2005, he joined SR Delémont of the Swiss Challenge League.

References

External links

1973 births
2017 deaths
Sportspeople from Vannes
French footballers
France under-21 international footballers
Ligue 1 players
Swiss Super League players
FC Sochaux-Montbéliard players
FC Lausanne-Sport players
AS Saint-Étienne players
SR Delémont players
French expatriate footballers
Expatriate footballers in Switzerland
Association football midfielders
ASM Belfort players
Footballers from Brittany
Brittany international footballers